Wilhelm Mansion and Carriage House is a historic mansion and carriage house located at Reading, Berks County, Pennsylvania. The house was built in 1877, and is a three-story, dwelling in the Gothic Revival style. A two-room addition was built in 1888. It is constructed of granite and measures 40 feet wide and 50 feet deep. It features a multi-gabled roof, four corbelled chimneys, and art glass windows. The two-story, granite carriage house was built in 1890.

It was listed on the National Register of Historic Places in 1982.

References

Buildings and structures in Reading, Pennsylvania
Houses on the National Register of Historic Places in Pennsylvania
Gothic Revival architecture in Pennsylvania
Houses completed in 1888
Houses in Berks County, Pennsylvania
National Register of Historic Places in Reading, Pennsylvania